Rock Creek is an  tributary of the John Day River in the U.S. state of Oregon. Rock Creek has a  watershed.

See also 
 List of rivers of Oregon
 List of longest streams of Oregon

References

Rivers of Oregon
Rivers of Gilliam County, Oregon